Nadezhda Vladimirovna Sozonova (born 14 August 1991) is a Russian rugby sevens player. She competed in the women's tournament at the 2020 Summer Olympics.

References

External links
 

1991 births
Living people
People from Aksaysky District
Russian female rugby sevens players
Olympic rugby sevens players of Russia
Rugby sevens players at the 2020 Summer Olympics
Place of birth missing (living people)
Sportspeople from Rostov Oblast